Karakuyu is a quarter of the town Davulga, Emirdağ District, Afyonkarahisar Province, Turkey. Its population is 182 (2021).

References

Populated places in Emirdağ District